Fallow is a farming technique in which arable land is left without sowing for one or more vegetative cycles. The goal of fallowing is to allow the land to recover and store organic matter while retaining moisture and disrupting pest life cycles and soil borne pathogens by temporarily removing their hosts. Crop rotation systems typically called for some of a farmer's fields to be left fallow each year.

The increase in intensive farming, including the use of cover crops in lieu of fallow practices, has caused a loss of acreage of fallow land, as well as field margins, hedges, and wasteland. This has reduced biodiversity; fallows have been the primary habitat for farmland bird populations.

Fallow syndrome

Fallow syndrome is when a crop has insufficient nutrient uptake due to the lack of arbuscular mycorhizae (AM fungi) in the soil following a fallow period. Crops such as corn that are prone to fallow syndrome should not follow a period of fallow, but instead should follow a cover crop which is a host for AM fungi, such as oats or other small grain crops. The presence of any plant roots, including weeds, can reduce occurrence of fallow syndrome. Nowadays, agricultural fields are routinely planted with cover crops to prevent erosion, keep down weeds, provide a green manure, and reduce the risk of fallow syndrome.

See also 
 Dryland farming
 Crop rotation
 No-till farming
 Shifting cultivation
 Shmita

References

Rural geography